The 1971 Western Kentucky football team represented Western Kentucky University during the 1971 NCAA College Division football season. The team was led by coach Jimmy Feix and won their second consecutive Ohio Valley Conference championship and the school's fourth overall. The coaching staff included future NFL coach Romeo Crennel.  The Hilltoppers’ rankings in the final polls were UPI 12 and AP 6, and finished ranked 1st in Pass Defense in NCAA Division II.
The team roster included future NFL players Virgil Livers, John Bushong, Clarence “Jazz” Jackson, and Mike McCoy.  Jim Barber was named to the Universal Sports All-American team.  The All OVC team included Barber, Terry Kokinda, Bob Morehead, Leo Peckenpaugh, Bill Sykes, and Terry Thompson.

Schedule

References

Western Kentucky
Western Kentucky Hilltoppers football seasons
Ohio Valley Conference football champion seasons
Western Kentucky Hilltoppers football